

1950

1951

1952

1953

1954

1955

1956

1957

1958

1959

1950–1959 Statistical Leaders

Source: ESPN College Football Encyclopedia

See also
 University of Arkansas
 Arkansas Razorbacks
 Arkansas Razorbacks football, 1940–1949
 Arkansas Razorbacks football, 1960–1969
 Cotton Bowl Classic
 Gator Bowl
 Southwest Conference

Notes

References
Arkansas Razorbacks Sports Network Online 1950–1959 Football Schedule/Results
Arkansas Razorbacks 1950 Football Schedule | Hog Database
Arkansas Razorbacks 1951 Football Schedule | Hog Database
Arkansas Razorbacks 1952 Football Schedule | Hog Database
Arkansas Razorbacks 1953 Football Schedule | Hog Database
Arkansas Razorbacks 1954 Football Schedule | Hog Database
Arkansas Razorbacks 1955 Football Schedule | Hog Database
Arkansas Razorbacks 1956 Football Schedule | Hog Database
Arkansas Razorbacks 1957 Football Schedule | Hog Database
Arkansas Razorbacks 1958 Football Schedule | Hog Database
Arkansas Razorbacks 1959 Football Schedule | Hog Database

1950s in Arkansas
1950s in sports in Arkansas